Skarvhalsen Saddle is an ice saddle just south of Neumayer Cliffs, between Peter Glacier and Swithinbank Slope, in Queen Maud Land. Mapped by Norwegian cartographers from surveys and air photos by Norwegian-British-Swedish Antarctic Expedition (NBSAE) (1949–52) and air photos by the Norwegian expedition (1958–59) and named Skarvhalsen (the barren mountain neck).

Mountain passes of Queen Maud Land
Princess Martha Coast